The Town of Newtown was a local government area in the Darling Downs region of Queensland, Australia, loosely based on the current Newtown, a suburb of Toowoomba. It existed between 1913 and 1917.

History
On 25 January 1913, the Shire of Gowrie was abolished and was split between the new Town of Newtown and the Shire of Jondaryan.

On 23 Feb 1917, the Town of Newtown was abolished, being split between the City of Toowoomba and the Shire of Jondaryan.

Mayors

 Joseph Troy

References

Former local government areas of Queensland
1917 disestablishments in Australia